The 2018 GT4 European Series was the eleventh season of the GT4 European Series, a sports car championship created and organised by the Stéphane Ratel Organisation (SRO). The season began on 7 April at Zolder and ended on 16 September at the Nürburgring. It was the first season, after it was renamed from GT4 European Series Northern Cup to GT4 European Series.

Calendar
At the annual press conference during the 2017 24 Hours of Spa on 28 July, the Stéphane Ratel Organisation announced the first draft of the 2018 calendar, in which Monza, Silverstone and Paul Ricard initially made an appearance. All three tracks were dropped from the schedule, when the finalised calendar was announced on 24 November 2017. The Red Bull Ring, the Slovakia Ring and Zandvoort did not return on the schedule, as Zolder, Spa-Francorchamps and the Hungaroring took their places.

Partners 
The GT4 European Series is supported by 5 sponsors. These are the tire manufacturer Pirelli, the lubricant specialist RAVENOL, the watch manufacturer CERTINA, Elf and Gullwing Racing Insurance.

Entry list

Race results
Bold indicates overall winner.

Championship standings
Scoring system
Championship points were awarded for the first ten positions in each race. Entries were required to complete 75% of the winning car's race distance in order to be classified and earn points. Individual drivers were required to participate for a minimum of 25 minutes in order to earn championship points in any race.

Drivers' championship

Teams' championship
Only the highest finishing car per team scored points and all other cars entered by that team were invisible as far as scoring points concerned. Only the highest ranked car in its respective category counted towards the championship. Parentheses indicate results that did not count towards the championship. Only two cars can be considered as forming the same team for the Teams' championship. If more than two cars are entered under the same competitor license, the competitor has to nominate the car numbers eligible to score points. Failure to do so will default the eligibility to score points to the two cars with the lowest car numbers.

See also
2018 French GT4 Cup
2018 GT4 Central European Cup

Notes

References

External links

GT4 European Series
GT4 European Series
GT4 European Series